Entrance to the Labyrinth is a 1989 Soviet five-episode television crime film directed by Valeriy Kremnev based on the Vayner Brothers novel Medicine against Fear.

Plot
The film consists of several storylines.

Main one occurs in the USSR in the 1980s - a detective story about scammers who, using a police identification card, break into the apartments of dishonest people and rob them under the guise of a search. When studying this case, investigator Muromtsev discovers a conflict between two inventors of miracle drug metaproptozole, called abroad as "medicine against fear". The professor does not believe in the existence of this drug because he did not succeed in inventing it himself. Therefore, he denies that his opponent Lyzhin, who is considered a kooky eccentric could invent such a drug. However, the criminals manage to poison the district plenipotentiary with this particular drug, after which they abduct the identity card and the government-issue weapons of the district police officer Pozdnyakov.

A parallel story tells about the life and tragic fate of the great physician and philosopher Paracelsus in the 16th century in Europe. In search of a mythical cure for all diseases, he makes discoveries, which form the basis of modern pharmacology. The life of Paracelsus is spent in constant wanderings.

Cast
Igor Kostolevsky — investigator Oleg Petrovich Muromtsev
Ivars Kalniņš — professor Alexander Nikolaevich Panafidin (voiced by Sergey Malishevsky)
Yuriy Nazarov — district police officer Andrei Filippovich Pozdnyakov
Zhanna Prokhorenko — wife of Pozdnyakov, Anna Vasilyevna
Tatyana Nazarova — daughter of Pozdnyakov, Dasha
Larisa Udovichenko — wife of Panafidin Olga Ilinichna
Alexander Novikov — Boris Chebakov
Lev Borisov — father of Chebakov
Yuri Gorobets — Sergey Ivanovich Golitsyn
Sergey Gazarov — Omar Sharifovich Ramazanov
Natalya Arinbasarova — Rashida Abbasovna Ramazanova
Mikhail Gluzsky — Professor Ilya Petrovich Blagolopov
Natalya Khorokhorina — Ekaterina Fedorovna Pachkalina
Leonid Kuravlyov — Lev Sergeevich Khlebnikov
Boris Romanov — Vladimir Konstantinovich Lyzhin
Kapitolina Ilyenko — neighbor Lyzhina
Boris Becker — Noah Markovich Khaletsky
Valentin Smirnitsky — Yakov Okun (voiced by Yuri Sarantsev)
Evgeny Platokhin — investigator in the Pozdnyakov case
Igor Statsenko — assistant professor Panafidin
Marina Ustimenko — Alexandrova
Klavdia Kozlenko — wife of Kashin
Tatiana Mitrushina — Okun's wife
Vladimir Nosik — Spirkin
Vladimir Troshin — Nikolai Sergeevich
Semyon Farada — Pontyaga
Roman Filippov — Nikolai Ignatievich Belavol
Vladimir Plotnikov — racer
Mikk Mikiver — Paracelsus (voiced by Rudolf Pankov)
Aleksandr Belyavsky — Mayor of Naousen
Yevgeniy Dvorzhetsky — Azriel
Villor Kuznetsov — Sorensen
Algimantas Masiulis — Baron Jacob Fugger (voiced by Nikolai Grabbe)
Donatas Banionis — Mazardi (voiced by Aleksandr Demyanenko)
George Teich — Erasmus of Rotterdam
Mati Klooren — Calvin (voiced by Igor Yasulovich)
Heino Mandri — Baron Hütter (voiced by Rogvold Sukhoverko)
Valentin Nikulin — Fiscal
Reino Aren — Froben (voiced by Vladimir Safronov)
Elena Yaralova — Sylvia

References

External links
 

Soviet television films
Soviet crime films
Gorky Film Studio films
1980s crime films